Band (Hungarian: Mezőbánd;) is a commune in Mureș County, Transylvania, Romania, composed of eleven villages:
Band
Drăculea Bandului / Drekulyatelep
Fânațe / Fekete
Iștan-Tău / Istentó
Mărășești / Marosesd
Negrenii de Câmpie / Feketelak
Oroiu / Székelyuraly
Petea / Mezőpete
Țiptelnic / Száltelek
Valea Mare / Nagyvölgy
Valea Rece / Hidegvölgy

Mădăraș village was part of the commune until 2004, when it was split off to form a separate commune. In 2011, Fânațele Mădărașului village was also split off and transferred to Mădăraș Commune.

Demographics

The commune is ethnically mixed and has a relative Székely Hungarian majority. According to the 2002 Census it has a population of 7,726 of which 45.42% or 3,509 are Hungarian, 2,868 or 37.12% Romanians and 1,349 or 17.46% Roma.

See also 
 List of Hungarian exonyms (Mureș County)

References

Communes in Mureș County
Localities in Transylvania
Székely communities